Kim Un-guk (born 28 October 1988) is a North Korean weightlifter, Olympic Champion, and two time World Champion.

He is also a Labor Hero and People's Athlete.

Career
At the Olympic Games 2012 he competed in the Men's 62-kg division, in the snatch portion of the competition he set an Olympic Record and matched the current world record of 153 kg. In the clean & jerk portion, his final attempt of 174 kg set a new world record total of 327 kg.

At the 2015 World Weightlifting Championships he failed a doping test and had his results disqualified. He was the original silver medalist.

Kim is an athlete at the April 25 Sports Club.

Major results

References

External links
 the-sports.org

1988 births
Living people
North Korean male weightlifters
Olympic weightlifters of North Korea
Weightlifters at the 2012 Summer Olympics
World record holders in Olympic weightlifting
Olympic gold medalists for North Korea
Asian Games medalists in weightlifting
Sportspeople from Pyongyang
Olympic medalists in weightlifting
Weightlifters at the 2010 Asian Games
Medalists at the 2012 Summer Olympics
Weightlifters at the 2014 Asian Games
World Weightlifting Championships medalists
People's Athletes
Asian Games gold medalists for North Korea
Asian Games silver medalists for North Korea
Medalists at the 2010 Asian Games
Medalists at the 2014 Asian Games
20th-century North Korean people
21st-century North Korean people